Giampiero Fossati (born 13 April 1944) is a retired Italian butterfly swimmer. He competed at the 1960, 1964 and 1968 Olympics with the best result of seventh place in the 4 × 100 m medley relay in 1964. He never reached a final in his individual events. Fossati won two gold medals at the Mediterranean Games in the medley relay.

References

External links
 
 
 

1944 births
Living people
Italian male swimmers
Italian male butterfly swimmers
Olympic swimmers of Italy
Swimmers at the 1960 Summer Olympics
Swimmers at the 1964 Summer Olympics
Swimmers at the 1968 Summer Olympics
Mediterranean Games medalists in swimming
Mediterranean Games gold medalists for Italy
Mediterranean Games silver medalists for Italy
Swimmers at the 1963 Mediterranean Games
Swimmers at the 1967 Mediterranean Games
20th-century Italian people
21st-century Italian people